Veynes is a commune in the Hautes-Alpes department in southeastern France. It developed largely as a minor rail hub, at the crossing of two lines.

Population

See also
Communes of the Hautes-Alpes department

References

Communes of Hautes-Alpes